Alexander Kogalev (born 22 May 1994) is a Belarusian professional ice hockey player currently playing with HC Yugra of the Kontinental Hockey League (KHL) and the Belarusian national team.

He participated at the 2017 IIHF World Championship.

In August 2022, HC Yugra announced the signing of a contract with a hockey player.

References

External links

1994 births
Living people
Belarusian ice hockey forwards
HC Dinamo Minsk players
Ice hockey people from Minsk
Yunost Minsk players